Qarah Parcheq (also Romanized as Qarah Pāecheq; also known as Qarah Pālcheq) is a village in Jargalan Rural District, Raz and Jargalan District, Bojnord County, North Khorasan Province, Iran. At the 2006 census, its population was 460, in 107 families.

References 

Populated places in Bojnord County